Charles Herman Olin (August 31, 1867 – October 4, 1914) was a Swedish-Canadian politician from Alberta.

Olin was born in Westergothland, Sweden to Olof and Sharlotte Olin. Olin emigrated from Sweden to the Nebraska, United States in 1886 and moved to Alberta, Canada in 1892.

He married Matilda Bengstone on November 17, 1894 and together had three children. Olin worked as a Inspector of Public Works and Bridge Foreman from 1898 to 1909. Olin served on the Wetaskiwin City Council and was the President of the Liberal Association of Wetaskiwin.

He was first elected to the Alberta Legislature in the 1909 Alberta general election as the new Liberal member for Wetaskiwin after long serving incumbent member Anthony Rosenroll did not seek another term in office.

Olin was re-elected to a second term in the 1913 Alberta general election, but he died less than a year into his second term after a month long illness on October 4, 1914.

References

External links

Legislative Assembly of Alberta Members Listing

1867 births
1914 deaths
Alberta Liberal Party MLAs
Canadian people of Swedish descent
Alberta municipal councillors